Maria of the End of the World (French: Maria du bout du monde) is a 1951 French adventure drama film directed by Jean Stelli and starring Paul Meurisse, Denise Cardi and Jacques Berthier. It is based on the 1941  novel La Chasse à l'homme by Jean Martet.

The film's sets were designed by the art director Raymond Druart.

Cast
 Paul Meurisse as Mathias
 Denise Cardi as Maria
 Jacques Berthier as Thierry
 Marcel Delaître as Va-Tout-Seul
 Marcel Raine as Césaire
 Charles Lemontier as 	Albin
 Francette Vernillat as Bertie
 Jacques Bougheriou as Norbert
 France Ellys as Delphine
 Paul Azaïs as Le vieil homme

References

Bibliography 
 Goble, Alan. The Complete Index to Literary Sources in Film. Walter de Gruyter, 1999.
 Rège, Philippe. Encyclopedia of French Film Directors, Volume 1. Scarecrow Press, 2009.

External links 
 

1951 films
1951 drama films
French drama films
1950s French-language films
Films directed by Jean Stelli
Films based on French novels
1950s French films

fr:Maria du bout du monde